Israel W. Charny (born 1931) is an Israeli psychologist and genocide scholar. He is the editor of two-volume Encyclopedia of Genocide, and executive director of the Institute on the Holocaust and Genocide in Jerusalem.

Background 
Israel Charny received his A.B. in Psychology with Distinction from Temple University in 1952, and his Ph.D. in clinical psychology from the University of Rochester in 1957. He established and directed the first group psychological practice in the Philadelphia area (1958–1973), where he was also the first Professor of Psychology at the newly founded  Reconstructionist Rabbinical College in Philadelphia.

An affiliate of the Institute for the Study of Genocide, the International Association of Genocide Scholars was founded in 1994 by Israel Charny, Helen Fein, Robert Melson and Roger Smith. From 2005-2007, he was Vice President and then President of the organization.

He has been devoted to the study of the Holocaust and genocide since the mid-1960s. His first publication on the subject which appeared in Jewish Education in 1968 was "Teaching the Violence of the Holocaust: A Challenge to Educating Potential Future Oppressors and Victims for Nonviolence." He once wrote, "...Genocide in the generic sense means the mass killing of substantial numbers of human beings, when not in the course of military action against the military forces of an avowed enemy, under conditions of the essential defencelessness of the victim..."

Charny, a clinical psychologist and practicing psychotherapist, was Professor of Psychology and Family Therapy at the Hebrew University of Jerusalem, where he was the Founder and first Director of the Program for Advanced Studies in Integrative Psychotherapy (Family, Couples, Individual and Group Therapy) of the Martin Buber Center and Department of Psychology. He was the founding and first president of the Israel Association of Family Therapy and later a president of the International Family Therapy Association.

He is best known for his active stance against denial of the Armenian genocide, and has written articles and given lectures on the subjects of genocide and genocide denial.
He is most noted for his comparison of Armenian genocide denial to Holocaust denial, citing that they both have similar techniques and psychological motivation.

Selected publications
Marital Love and Hate
Existential/Dialectical Marital Therapy
Encyclopedia of Genocide*
Genocide: A Critical Bibliographic Review*
The Widening Circle of Genocide
Century of Genocide Critical Essays and Eyewitness Accounts
Fascism and Democracy in the Human Mind*
The Genocide Contagion
"A Classification of Denials of the Holocaust and Other Genocides", Journal of Genocide Research 2003, 5(1), pp. 11–34.

*Each of these three books was awarded "Outstanding Academic Book of the Year" by Choice'' of the American Library Association.

References

External links 
Biography of Israel Charny
List of books by Israel Charny
Genocide Prevention Now, founded and directed by Israel Charny
 

Jewish scholars
Israeli historians
Living people
1931 births
Temple University alumni
University of Rochester alumni
Academic staff of the Hebrew University of Jerusalem